The following is a list of episodes from the animated television series Beetlejuice. The first season consisted of 13 episodes. The second and third seasons each consisted of 8 episodes. The fourth and final season consisted of 65 episodes. The series premiered on September 9, 1989 and ended on December 6, 1991. Shout! Factory released the entire series on May 20 2013.

Series overview

Episodes

Season 1 (1989)

Season 2 (1990) 
The second and third seasons each contained eight episodes, which makes shortest seasons to air.

Season 3 (1991)

Season 4 (1991) 
The fourth and final season contained sixty-five episodes, which makes it the longest season to air. Note: Lydia is absent from the episodes "You're History," "Sore Feet," "The Miss Beauty Juice Pageant," "Ghoul of my Dreams," "Don't Beetlejuice and Drive," and "Catmandu Got Your Tongue." Note: The only season that every episode is double length.

External links 
 
 

Lists of American children's animated television series episodes
Lists of Canadian children's animated television series episodes